Hannes Hertel is a German botanist and taxonomist and was Director of the State Herbarium in Munich, Germany 1992 - 2004. His specialist areas are the fungi and lichens.

Early life and education
Hannes Hertel was born in 1939. His doctorate was awarded in 1967 for work on members of the lichen genus Lecidea that thrive on lime rich rocks and sites. This was undertaken under the guidance of Josef Poelt.

Career
He was appointed to an academic post at University of Berlin in 1972 but in 1973 he moved to Munich to take up the post of curator at the State Herbarium in Munich. He became the provisional director from 1985 to 1992 and was then confirmed as Director and remained until his retirement in 2004. His specialist area was the taxonomy of lichens, and especially the genus Lecidea that he had first studied for his doctorate. He and students that he supervised brought order and a critical review of the 1000 accepted and 4000 published names within the genus in the early 1970s. 

The State Herbarium in Munich contains the lichen collection of Ferdinand Christian Gustav Arnold, 100,000 - 150,000 specimens collected in the nineteenth century. Hertel made a particular effort to transcribe the detailed labels from Arnold's handwriting that was difficult to read and ensured this was published so that the collection could be more easily used by others.

Publications
Hertel is the author or co-author of several books and scientific publications. They include:

 Peter Dobbeler and Hannes Hertel (2013) Bryophilous ascomycetes everywhere: Distribution maps of selected species on liverworts, mosses and Polytrichaceae. Hertzogia 26 (2) pp361-404

 J Hafellner, H Hertel, G Rambold and E Timdal (1994) Lecanorales pp 379-387 in Ascomycete Systematics: Problems and perspectives in the nineties ed. D L Hawksworth, NATO Advanced Science Institutes Series, Series A, Life Sciences. Plenum Press, New York.

 Edited by Hannes Hertel and Franz Oberwinkler (1985) Festschrift J. Poelt  Nova Hedwigia Beihefte Verlag: Lubrecht & Cramer Ltd.

Honours and awards
In 2004 a Festschrift was held on his 65th birthday to celebrate his contributions to lichenology. Hertel was awarded the Acharius Medal for his lifetime's work that has made an outstanding contributions to lichenology in 2008.

Several genera have been named after Hertel, including Hertelidea  (2004), Herteliana  (1980); and Hertella  (1985). Many species have also been named to honour Hertel. These include: Biatora hertelii  (1998); Caloplaca hanneshertelii  (2004); Caloplaca hertelii  (2004); Carbacanthographis hertelii  (2004); Carbonea herteliana  (1999); Carbonea hertelii  (1999); Cornutispora herteliana  (2004); Homostegia hertelii  (2004);   Lecanora herteliana  (2000); Lecidea herteliana  (2012); Lecidella herteliana  (1994); Lobaria hertelii  (2004); Placopsis hertelii  (2004); Porpidia herteliana  (1989); Rinodina herteliana  (2006); Roccella hertelii  (2004); Sphagnum hertelianum  (2002); and Trapelia herteliana  (2004).

See also
 :Category:Taxa named by Hannes Hertel

References

Living people
1939 births
German lichenologists
German botanists
German taxonomists
Acharius Medal recipients
20th-century German scientists
21st-century German scientists